William Johnston Smyth (2 November 1936 – 26 January 2011) was an eminent broadcaster and sports journalist in Northern Ireland.  Born on 2 November 1936, he originated from the Antrim Road district of north Belfast.  He was educated at Methodist College Belfast and The Queen's University, Belfast, graduating with a degree in psychology.

Broadcasting career 

Smyth was a school teacher and was an educational psychologist, before embarking as a broadcaster in the 1960s at the BBC Northern Ireland Home Service, which later became known as BBC Radio Ulster.  In the early 1970s Bill was employed with BBC Radio Bristol, in the west of England.

When Northern Ireland's first commercial radio station, Downtown Radio, went on air in March 1976, Bill was one of its original presenters, working on the shows Downtown Downbeat and The Sunday Request Show.

1978 saw his move into television broadcasting when he joined the popular Northern Ireland ITV licence holder Ulster Television as a Newscaster and Continuity Announcer, a move that made him one of Havelock House's famous celebrities and household names.  He remained with the station until 1987.

Thereafter, the father of four daughters, worked as a journalist with the Antrim Guardian.  He also spent some time at Townland Radio in Cookstown, Co. Tyrone, and in 1997 moved to Belfast Community Radio/Citybeat.

In addition to his sports reporting for the Irish News, the Ulster edition of The Mirror and other publications, he was a travel news announcer with emerging Belfast radio station U105 (2005–2010) launched by UTV Media plc, one of the largest media organisations in the UK and Ireland, which grew out of Bill's former employer, Ulster Television.

In 2009, however, he narrated 'The Old Road to Dublin' by Belfast-based indie Notassuch Films, a documentary film and online comedy about 'social attitudes, improved infrastructure, the new Ireland, cultural heritage and drink!' that featured BBC Northern Ireland broadcaster Joe Lindsay.  Bill's hilarious; close-to-the-knuckle commentary sees him in another light, as his polished intonation and wisecracks make it entertaining.

Formerly a resident of Rosstulla Avenue in Newtownabbey's Jordanstown area, Bill died of cancer on 26 January 2011 in Belfast City Hospital.

1936 births
2011 deaths
Queen's University at Kingston alumni
Journalists from Northern Ireland
People educated at Methodist College Belfast
Male non-fiction writers from Northern Ireland